Vice Admiral Sir Jonathan James Richard Tod KCB CBE (born 26 March 1939) is a former Royal Navy officer who became Deputy Commander-in-Chief Fleet.

Naval career
Educated Gordonstoun and the Royal Naval College, Dartmouth, Tod joined the Royal Navy in 1959 and qualified as a naval pilot. He went on to command the frigate HMS Brighton and the destroyer HMS Fife. As a captain, Tod served in the Cabinet Office during the Falklands War for which he was awarded the CBE and after that commanded the aircraft carrier HMS Illustrious, succeeding Vice-Admiral Peter Woodhead, (in which Tod led the operation to recover survivors following the blowout of the Odyssey Oil Platform in 1988). He became Flag Officer Portsmouth in 1989 and Deputy Commander-in-Chief Fleet in 1994 before retiring in 1997.

In October 1965 Tod ejected from a Hawker Hunter following a mid-air collision during an air combat exercise in Scotland.

References

1939 births
Living people
Royal Navy vice admirals
Knights Commander of the Order of the Bath
Commanders of the Order of the British Empire
People educated at Gordonstoun